Fu Kuiqing (28 November 1920 – 28 August 2022) was a lieutenant general in the People's Liberation Army of China who served as political commissar of the Nanjing Military Region from 1985 to 1990. He was a delegate to the 5th National People's Congress and was a member of the Standing Committee of the 7th National People's Congress. He was a representative of the 10th, 12th, and 13th National Congress of the Chinese Communist Party. He was a member of the 12th Central Committee of the Chinese Communist Party.

Biography
He joined the Chinese Communist Party (CCP) in August 1938 and enlisted in the New Fourth Army one year later. During the Second Sino-Japanese War, he served in the New Fourth Army and fought with the Imperial Japanese Army in east China's Anhui province. In 1949, he was assigned to the 3rd Field Army of the People's Liberation Army, and engaged in the Menglianggu campaign, Huaihai campaign, and the Yangtze River Crossing campaign.

After founding of the Communist State in 1949, he served in the 25th Army for a long time. He participated in the Korean War in April 1953 and returned to China in 1958. He was made director of the Political Department of the 23rd Army in January 1964. In February 1966, he became deputy political commissar, rising to political commissar in February 1969. He was appointed vice governor and party secretary of Heilongjiang in August 1971, concurrently serving as deputy political commissar of the Shenyang Military Region since October 1975. He also served as director of the Political Department from December 1977 to December 1980. He retired in July 1998.

He attained the rank of lieutenant general (zhongjiang) in September 1988. 

On 28 August 2022, he died from an illness in Nanjing, Jiangsu, at the age of 102.

References

1920 births
2022 deaths
People from Yingshan County, Hubei
People's Liberation Army generals from Hubei
People's Republic of China politicians from Hubei
Chinese Communist Party politicians from Hubei
Delegates to the 5th National People's Congress
Members of the Standing Committee of the 7th National People's Congress
Members of the 12th Central Committee of the Chinese Communist Party
Chinese centenarians
Men centenarians